Friedrich Karl Kühmstedt (20 December 1809 – 8 January 1858) was a German composer. He studied with Johann Nepomuk Hummel in Weimar. His work includes symphonies, fugues and preludes for organ.

References

External links
 
 

1809 births
1858 deaths
19th-century German composers